The 4HP 22 is a four-speed automatic transmission from ZF Friedrichshafen AG for passenger cars with rear wheel drive or 4X4 layout. Introduced in 1980, it was produced through 2003, and has been used in a variety of cars from BMW, General Motors, Jaguar, Land Rover, Maserati, Peugeot, Porsche, and Volvo.

Specifications

Torque
The ZF 4HP 22 can handle from 100 to 380 NM of input torque.

Technical data

Applications

4HP 22
BMW
E30
1984–1988 316 M10/B18
1987–1988 316i M10/B18
1988–1994 316i M40/B16
1984–1987 318i M10/B18
1987–1994 318i M40/B18
1982–1993 320i M20/B20
1982–1986 323i M20/B23
1985–1990 324d M21/D24
1987–1990 324td M21/D24
1983–1988 325e M20/B27: Type A
1985–1993 325i M20/B25: Type A
1986–1992 325ix M20/B25: Type A
E28
1981–1987 518i M10/B18: Type B
1981–1987 520i M20/B20: Type B
1986–1988 524d M21/D24: Type B
1983–1987 524td M21/D24: Type B
1983–1988 525e M20/B27: Type A
1981–1987 525i M30/B25: Type A
1981–1987 528e M20/B27
1981–1987 528i M30/B28: Type A
1983–1984 533i M30/B32
1984–1988 535i M30/B34: Type A
E24
1983–1989 633CSi M30/B32
1983–1987 635CSi M30/B34
E23
1983–1984 733i M30/B32
1984–1987 735i M30/B34: Type A
1984–1987 745i (South African version) M88/3: Type A
E34
1988–1992 520i M20/B20: Type A
1988–1992 524td M21/D24: Type B
1988–1990 525i M20/B25 : Type A
1988–1992 530i M30/B30 : Type A
1988–1993 535i M30/B35: Type A
E32
1986–1994 730i M30/B30: Type A
1986–1992 735i M30/B35: Type A
1986–1992 735iL M30/B35: Type A
Chevrolet
Opala
1988–1992 2.5 (151): Type A
1988–1992 4.1 (250): Type A
Jaguar
XJ40
1987–1993 3.6
X300
1994–1997 3.2
XJS 
1987–1991 3.6
Land Rover
Defender
1997 90 V8 4.0L North America Spec
1998 90 V8 4.0L Defender 50th Special Edition
 Discovery (Series I)
1992–1999  V8 3.9L
Discovery (Series II)
1999–2002 V8 4.0L
Range Rover
1987–2002 (except 4.6)
Lincoln
Continental
1984–1985 2.4 litre (BMW-Steyr turbodiesel)
Lotus
Lotus Excel
 Excel SA 1986 –1991  Twin Cam 4 Cyl Lotus 2.2L 180bhp
Maserati
Biturbo
1988–1997 2.5 V6
1988–1997 2.8 V6
Quattroporte
1994–1998 2.8 V6
Peugeot
505
1986–1997 2.0 (XN,): Type A
1986–1997 2.0 (ZEJ): Type A
1986–1997 2.2 (N9T,): Type A
1986–1997 2.2 (ZDJ): Type A
1986–1997 2.5 (XD3): Type A
1986–1997 2.8 (ZN3J): Type A
604
1987–1989 2.5
Volvo
740
pre–1985 GL, GLE 2.3 (non turbo) B230F: Type B
1986–after GL, GLE 2.3 (non turbo) B230F: Type A
1984–1986 2.4L TD (ZF 4HP 22L)
760
1986–1991 2.3L
1983–1986 GLE 2.4 Turbo Diesel D24T: Type B
940
1991–1995 2.3

4HP 22EH
Four-wheel drive configuration
Land Rover
Discovery (Series II)
1999–2004 TD5 Diesel

4HP 22HL
Rear-engine design rear-wheel drive configuration
Porsche
1989–1993 Porsche 911 Carrera II 3.6
1993–1998 Porsche 993 3.6

See also
List of ZF transmissions

References

4HP 22